Gildernew is a surname. Notable people with the surname include:

 Michelle Gildernew (born 1970), Irish politician
 Colm Gildernew (born 1969), Irish politician